Ports in West Bengal support international trade. Since ancient times, trade in West Bengal has been closely related to the river and seaports. The waterways have still not lost their importance. The primary port in the eastern Indian state of West Bengal is the Port of Calcutta. This Port is managed by the Calcutta Port Trust.

West Bengal has a coastline of 157 km in South 24 Pargana district and East Midnapore districts. The Seaport was built on the banks of the Hooghly River and coastline in West Bengal. Kolkata Port is India's oldest port. Almost 50 million tons per year goods pass through the port of West Bengal. About 45 million tons of cargo per year are transported to Kolkata port (including Haldia port). Annually more than 6 million TEUs containers pass through West Bengal ports .

Ports

References

External links

Ports and harbours of West Bengal